is a Japanese manga series written and illustrated by Mikio Igarashi. It was serialized in Shogakukan's Monthly Ikki from June 2010 to June 2013, with its chapters collected in three wideban volumes.

Publication
I is written and illustrated by Mikio Igarashi. It was serialized in Shogakukan's Monthly Ikki from June 25, 2010, to June 25, 2013. Shogakukan collected its chapters in three wideban volumes, released from July 29, 2011, to August 30, 2013.

Volume list

Reception
Along with Hozuki's Coolheadedness, I ranked #19 on Kono Manga ga Sugoi! 2012's Top 10 Manga for Male Readers. It was nominated for the 16th, 17th and 18th Tezuka Osamu Cultural Prizes in 2012, 2013 and 2014, respectively.

References

External links
Official website at Ikki Paradise 

Seinen manga
Shogakukan manga